In geomorphology, an erg is a large desert region of sand dunes with little or no vegetation,it is divided into 3 parts back erg ,central erg,fore erg, especially in the Sahara.
This is a list of ergs around the world.

Africa

Algeria
 Grand Erg Oriental (extends into Tunisia)
 Grand Erg Occidental
 Erg Chech (extends into Mali)
 Erg Iguidi (extends into Mauritania)
 Erg Issaouane
 Erg er-Raoui
 Erg Tiferine
 Erg Tidohaine
 Erg Merhiti
 Erg Admer

 Botswana
 Kalahari Desert

 Chad
 Erg Djourab
 Erg Idrisi

 Egypt
 Black Desert
 Erg Abunugar
 Erg Abu Muharrik
 Erg Abu Ramada
 Gilf Kebir
 Ramla el Kebir
 Erg Somaya
 Negev Desert (extends into Israel)
Great Sand Sea Desert
 White Desert

 Libya
 Erg Awbari
 Erg Ubari
 Erg Titersine
 Erg Idehan Murzuq
 Erg Ouan Kasa
 Erg Tannezouft
 Erg Takarkouri
 Erg Mehedjibat
 Erg Tassegefit
 Calanshio Sand Sea
 Rebiana Sand Sea

 Mali
 Erg Achaif
 Erg Aoukar (extends into Mauritania)
 Erg Atouila
 Erg Outouila

 Mauritania
 Erg Amatlich
 Erg Aoukar
 Erg Akchar
 Erg Azefal (extends into Western Sahara)
 Erg Taokest

 Morocco
 Erg Chebbi
 Erg Chigaga
 Erg Znaigui
 Erg Tinfou
 Erg Ezzahar
 Erg Lihoudi
 Erg Mghiti
 Erg Smar
 Erg Jerboia
 Erg Zemoul

 Namibia
 Namib Desert

 Niger
 Jadal
 Erg Brousset
 Ténéré
 Tafassasset
 Great Bilma Erg or 'Kaouar' (extends into Chad)

 Sudan
 Erg Selima

 Western Sahara
 Erg Azefal

Asia
 China
 Taklamakan, Xinjiang
 Dzungaria, Xinjiang
 Tengger Desert, Ningxia
 Ordos Desert, Inner Mongolia

 Iran
 Dasht-e Lut

 India
 Thar Desert
 Nubra Valley

 Kazakhstan
 Moin Kum
 Kyzyl Kum (extends into Uzbekistan and Turkmenistan)

 Mongolia
 Nomin Mingan Gobi

 Pakistan
 Cholistan Desert
 Kharan Desert

 Saudi Arabia
 Rub' al Khali
 Dahna
 Great Nefud
 Jafurah
 Nefud Es Sirr
 Nefud Eth Thuwairat
 Nefud Shudaiah

 Turkmenistan
 Karakum Desert
 Turan
 Zaunguz

Australia
 Gibson Desert
 Great Sandy Desert
 Great Victoria Desert
 Simpson Desert

North America 
 Mexico

 Gran Desierto de Altar, Sonora
 Samalayuca Dune Fields, Chihuahua

 United States
 Algodones Dunes, California
 Great Sand Dunes National Park and Preserve, Colorado
 Navajo Sandstone (former Jurassic age erg has since formed sandstone)
 Nebraska Sandhills, Nebraska (active 800-1000 years ago, now vegetated)
 White Sands National Park, New Mexico
 Yuma Desert, Arizona

South America

 Chile
 Atacama Desert

 Peru
 Great Ica Desert

References